Glimmer Glen Creek is a creek in central Otsego County, New York. It flows into Otsego Lake north of Cooperstown, New York and south of Brookwood Point.

References

Rivers of New York (state)
Rivers of Otsego County, New York